is a Japanese Professional baseball Infielder for the Fukuoka SoftBank Hawks of Nippon Professional Baseball.

Early baseball career
Kawase participated in the 1st grade summer 95th Japanese High School Baseball Championship with Shunsuke Kasaya and Masato Morishita at the Ōita Prefectural Ōita Commercial High School. He had a rivalry with Morishita, who competed for pitcher and shortstop positions in high school.

Professional career
On October 22, 2015, Kawase was drafted by the Fukuoka Softbank Hawks in the 2015 Nippon Professional Baseball draft.

On January 5, 2016, He underwent surgery for a broken left hand.

In 2016-2017 season, he played in the Western League of NPB's minor leagues and played in informal matches against Shikoku Island League Plus's teams.

On May 23, 2018, Kawase debuted as a shortstop against the Saitama Seibu Lions. On the 24th of the following day, he recorded his first hit. And he was selected as the Japan Series roster in the 2018 Japan Series.

In the 2019 season, Kawase finished the regular season in 29 games with a batting average of .176.

In 2020 season, Kawase finished the regular season in 70 games with a batting average of .191, a RBI of 6 runs and a stolen base of 2.  Kawase was selected as the Japan Series roster in the 2020 Japan Series. And he recorded his first hit in the  Japan Series.

September 20, 2021, he was named a starter against the Tohoku Rakuten Golden Eagles and recorded three hits. However, he did not get many chances and finished the 2021 season with a .185 batting average in 21 games played.

On July 18, 2022, Kawase would record a two-run double against the Chiba Lotte Marines. On August 18, he was removed from the first team registration with a positive COVID-19, but was re-registered on September 3. On September 12 against the Saitama Seibu Lions he started the seventh inning on defense and recorded a two-run double. In 2022 season, he finished the regular season with a .278 batting average, 11 runs batted in, and 2 stolen bases in 73 games, his highest number of appearances despite being used as an infield reserve.

References

External links

Career statistics - NPB.jp
00 Hikaru Kawase PLAYERS2022 - Fukuoka SoftBank Hawks Official site

1997 births
Living people
Fukuoka SoftBank Hawks players
Japanese baseball players
Nippon Professional Baseball infielders
Baseball people from Ōita Prefecture
People from Ōita (city)